Killing Moon may refer to:

"The Killing Moon", a 1984 song by Echo & the Bunnymen
Killing Moon: The Best of Echo & the Bunnymen, a 2007 compilation album by Echo & the Bunnymen
Killing Moon (band), a heavy metal band
The Killing Moon (book), a 2012 novel by N.K. Jemisin
Killing Moon (2000 television film), a 2000 America television film starring Kim Coates

See also
Under a Killing Moon, a 1994 computer game